The 2019 Canadian Premier League season was the inaugural season of the Canadian Premier League, the top level of Canadian professional soccer. The regular season began on April 27 and ended on October 19, with seven teams competing. The inaugural match of the Canadian Premier League took place between Forge FC and York9 at Tim Hortons Field on April 27, 2019, which ended in a 1–1 draw.

The CPL Finals were contested between the Spring and Fall season champions, Cavalry FC, and the Spring and Fall season runners-up, Forge FC, in October and November. Forge FC won 2–0 over two legs to win the inaugural Canadian Premier League title.

Overview

Background

On May 6, 2017, the Canadian Premier League was unanimously approved and sanctioned by the Canadian Soccer Association. Seven teams competed in the first Canadian Premier League season, leaving four professional Canadian teams playing in United States-based leagues (Montreal Impact, Toronto FC and Vancouver Whitecaps FC in Major League Soccer and Ottawa Fury FC in the USL Championship). The CPL teams competed in the 2019 Canadian Championship with the Canadian MLS and USL teams, and the champions of the Ontario and Quebec tier three leagues.

Teams

Seven teams competed during this season – six newly-formed teams and one existing team which joined the CPL. The six new teams were Cavalry FC, Forge FC, HFX Wanderers FC, Pacific FC, Valour FC, and York9 FC. FC Edmonton announced their move to the CPL having previously ceased professional operations following their 2017 season in the North American Soccer League.

Stadiums and locations

Personnel and sponsorship
Note: All teams use the same kit manufacturer: Macron.

Coaching changes

Format
The Canadian Premier League season ran from late April to October. Each team played 28 games, split between a spring and fall season. The 10-game spring season began on April 27 and ended on Canada Day, July 1. The 18-game fall season began on July 6 and ended on October 19. The winner of each season gained a berth into the 2019 Canadian Premier League Finals.

Spring season

Table

2019 CONCACAF League qualification
One Canadian Premier League team qualifies annually for the CONCACAF League tournament. For the 2019 edition only, this slot was granted to one of the league's 'inaugural teams' (FC Edmonton, Forge FC, or Valour FC) based on their home and away matches in the 2019 spring season. In subsequent years, CONCACAF League qualification is awarded to the previous year's CPL champion.

Results

Fall season

Table

Results

Finals

The winners of the spring and fall seasons gained berths to the two-legged CPL Finals. As a contingency implemented this year because a single team won both halves of the season, the second berth was given to the team with the second-best overall record. The two games were played on October 26, 2019 and November 2, 2019, with the winner of the Fall season choosing which leg to host.

Overall table

Results
The first leg was held on October 26, and the second leg on November 2, 2019.

|}

Attendance

Statistical leaders 
Statistics include regular season and Finals.

Top scorers

Top assists

Clean sheets

Hat-tricks

Awards

Premier Performer
The Premier Performer presented by Volkswagen Canada is presented to the CPL's top player based on an algorithm developed by the league and its data analysis provider. The winner receives a 2019 Volkswagen Jetta GLI, handed out at the Canadian Premier League Awards ceremony.

Canadian Premier League Awards
On November 1, 2019, the Canadian Premier League revealed the five individual awards to be given based on performance over the whole season including Finals. The awards are Inuit soapstone sculptures designed by artists from Cape Dorset, Nunavut. The recipients of the awards were announced at a ceremony in Toronto on November 26.

Fan Awards
The Canadian Premier League allowed fans to vote for a series of Fan Awards for a chance to win various prizes. The winners were announced on December 16.

Player transfers

U Sports Draft

The 2018 CPL–U Sports Draft was held on November 12 in Vancouver, British Columbia. Draftees were invited to team preseason camps, with an opportunity to earn a developmental contract and retain their U Sports men's soccer eligibility. Cavalry FC selected Gabriel Bitar with the first overall pick. Three players were selected by each team, with a total of twenty-one players being drafted including fifteen Canadians.

Foreign players
Canadian Premier League teams may sign a maximum of seven international players, out of which only five can be in the starting line-up for each match. The following players are considered foreign players for the 2019 season. This list does not include Canadian citizens who represent other countries at international level.

References

 
2019
2019 in Canadian soccer